August Frederick Kammer Jr. (June 3, 1912 – February 21, 1996) was an American ice hockey player and amateur golfer.

Ice Hockey
In 1936 he was a member of the American ice hockey team, which won the bronze medal in the 1936 Winter Olympics.

Golf
Kammer was a noted amateur golfer. He played in the 1947 Walker Cup.

Personal life
Kammer was born in Montclair, New Jersey and died in Hobe Sound, Florida.

References

External links
 
 

1912 births
1996 deaths
American men's ice hockey forwards
Ice hockey players from New Jersey
Hotchkiss School alumni
Ice hockey players at the 1936 Winter Olympics
Medalists at the 1936 Winter Olympics
Olympic bronze medalists for the United States in ice hockey
American male golfers
Amateur golfers
People from Montclair, New Jersey
Sportspeople from Essex County, New Jersey
Golfers from New Jersey
Princeton University alumni